Thomas Clifford Emmott (1907–1964) was a British writer and political activist.

Emmott was born in Burnley, Lancashire, and grew up in Colne. He travelled the world, collecting curiosities such as emu and rhea eggs, a large trilobite, and pieces of volcanic rock.  He fought in World War I, and later claimed to have served with Military Intelligence. He returned, in the 1940s, to live in Wycoller Cottage, becoming the only long-term resident of the remote village.  While there, he wrote an autobiography entitled An Outlaw in the 20th Century and a volume entitled Eamot Eternal, in which he described his family's supposed descent from inhabitants of Atlantis and the incredible feats of ancestors who shared his name.

In 1959, Emmott formed the "Lancastrian Party", with the stated aim of attracting attention to the neglect of north-east Lancashire, and of representing "the little people who slink round lampposts".  He carved a stone in the garden with the inscription "LANCASTRIAN PARTY HQ", and stood in Nelson and Colne at the 1959 general election, and promoted his candidacy by distributing leaflets and badges.  His campaign attracted limited interest, with his public meetings only having three or four attendees.  He took 4.6% of the votes cast, and lost his deposit.

Emmott remained at the cottage for many years, and became known for writing letters to prominent individuals complaining of persecution.  In particular, he claimed that people had been prevented from attending his campaign meetings.  This left him frequently unemployed and in poor health.

References

1907 births
Date of birth missing
English writers
People from Colne
Political activists
1964 deaths